Julius Withers Monk (10 Nov 1912, Spencer, North Carolina – 17 Aug 1995, New York City, New York) was an American impresario in the New York cabaret scene. His 1956 revue, Four Below, has been characterized as "the first legitimate cafe revue in New York City"

Biography
Monk was born into a well-heeled and well-established family of North Carolina. After training at the Cincinnati Conservatory of Music, he earned his living playing piano in New York City and France, then became manager (1942) of the New York nightclub Le Ruban Bleu, owned by his associate Herbert Jacoby. In 1956, Monk left that establishment for San Francisco's the hungry i, where he did duty as master of ceremonies. Soon, however, Murray Grand, new manager of the Downstairs Room (formerly the Purple Onion), recalled Monk to Manhattan. On March 4, 1956, his opening revue, Four Below (starring Dody Goodman) was a triumph. (It was characterized as "the first legitimate cafe revue in New York City" by James Gavin, author of the 1991 book Intimate Nights, The Golden Age of New York Cabaret.) At the new venue (officially: the Upstairs At The Downstairs, West 56th Street) Monk then staged a succession of revues by writers such as Tom Jones and Harvey Schmidt (later collaborators on The Fantasticks), Louis Botto, Sheldon Harnick, Herb Hartig, Gerry Matthews, John Meyer and Tom Poston.

Monk's annual revues established the standard for New York cabaret over the following decade: Take Five (1957), Demi-Dozen (1958), Four Below Strikes Back (1959), Pieces of Eight (1959), Dressed to the Nines (1960) and 7 Come 11 (1961). Performers hired and/or cultivated by Monk include Jean Arnold, Michael Brown, Ceil Cabot, Thelma Carpenter, Pat Carroll, Imogene Coca, Jane and Gordon Connell, Blossom Dearie and Annie Ross; collaborators and associates also included Robert Downey Sr., George Furth, Alice Ghostley, Ronny Graham, Tammy Grimes, Ellen Hanley, Bill Hinnant, Susan Johnson, Liberace, Dorothy Loudon, Portia Nelson, Bibi Osterwald, Norman Paris, Lovelady Powell, Caspar Reardon, Rex Robbins, William Roy, Maxine Sullivan, Nancy Dussault, Sylvia Syms, Fredricka Weber and Mary Louise Wilson.

Friction between Monk and owner Irving Haber prompted the former to leave and in 1962 he and Thomas Hammond opened a new nightclub — the Rendezvous Room (Plaza 9) — at the Plaza Hotel. There his troupe continued with revues such as Dime A Dozen (1962), Baker's Dozen (1964),  and Bits & Pieces XIV (1964). Many unknown performers who worked at Monk's cafe revues, including Ken Berry, Ruth Buzzi, and Liz Sheridan, among others, went on to achieve varying degrees of fame. Monk's last revue at the Plaza, Four In Hand, closed on 29 June 1968 after which he retired.

Monk died at age 82 in August 1995 at his home in Manhattan.

Legacy and assessment
In the 1960s, Mad published "The Agony and the Agony" (a parody of the film The Agony and the Ecstasy) with the plotline moved from Renaissance Rome to present-day New York City. The film's antagonist, Pope Julius II, was updated by Mad as nightclub entrepreneur Julius Pope, a satire of Julius Monk. 
Monk, who was not above claiming credit for discovering already established stars, did not have an unerring eye and ear for talent; he turned down Barbra Streisand and misunderstood the appeal of Billie Holiday who was somewhat out of place in these snooty venues.

Discography

Take Five with Ronny Graham; Offbeat Records (OLP 4013): Julius Monk Revue;– Ronny Graham, Ceil Cabot, Ellen Hanley, Jean Arnold, Gerry Matthews [5/1958] 
Introductory "Notes"
"You've Got to Open the Show"
Roger, the Rabbit
Westport/Portofino
Jefferson Davis Tyler's General Store
Gristedes
Say Hello
Poets' Corner
Pro Musica Antiqua
Gossiping Grapevine
Night Heat
Finale-Doing the Psycho-Neurotique
Julius Monk Presents Demi-Dozen; Offbeat Records (OLP 4015) - Julius Monk Revue [1/1959] 
Grand Opening
Yes Sirree
Mist OffBroadway
You Fascinate Me So
Conference Call
Holy Man and the New Yorker
Race of the Lexington Avenue Express
Sunday in New York
Intellectual's Rag
Portofino
One and All
Seasonal Sonatina
Thire Avenue El
Guess Who Was There
Grand Finale
Pieces of Eight; Offbeat Records (OLP 4016): Julius Monk Revue - Julius Monk Revue [1959] 
Overture
Happiness is a Bird
And Then I Wrote
Radio City Music Hall
Miss Williams
Uncle Bergie Evans Show
Oriental
Ardent Admirer
Steel Guitars and Barking Seals
Election Spectacular
A Name of Our Own
M'Lady Chatterley
Seasons' Greetings
Farewell
Everybody Wants to Be Loved
Night the Hurricane Struck
A Conversation Piece
Four Below Strikes Back; Offbeat Records (OLP 4017): Julius Monk Revue - Julius Monk Revue [1959] 
Overture and Opening
Leave Your Mind Alone
Mr. X
It's a Wonderful day to Be Seventeen
Castro Tango!
Charlie Chan
Sitwells
Merry-Go, Merry-Go-Round
Jefferson Davis Tyler's General Store
Four Seasons/Speak No Love
Constant Nymphet
Man Tan
Lola Montez
Family Fallout Shelter
Literary Time
Love, Here I Am
Payola 
Julius Monk presents Tammy Grimes (1959)
Julius Monk Simply Plays (and / or Vice-versa) - 1959  
Seven Come Eleven; Columbia Records LP (55477): Julius Monk Revue - New York Cast [1961]
Dressed to the Nines - LP
It's Your Fault
Dime A Dozen; Cadence Records LP (CLP 3063, mono; CLP 25063, stereo): Julius Monk Revue - New York Cast [1962]

References

External links
Julius Monk papers, 1906-1991. Held by the Billy Rose Theatre Division, New York Public Library for the Performing Arts

1912 births
1995 deaths
People from Spencer, North Carolina
20th-century American businesspeople